is a railway station in the city of Yurihonjō, Akita Prefecture,  Japan, operated by the third-sector  railway operator Yuri Kōgen Railway.

Lines
Maegō Station is served by the Chōkai Sanroku Line, and is located 11.7 kilometers from the terminus of the line at Ugo-Honjō Station.

Station layout
The station has two opposed side platforms. The station is unattended.

Platforms

Adjacent stations

History
Maegō Station opened on August 1, 1922 as a station on the Yokojō Railway, which became the Japanese Government Railways (JGR) Yashima Line on September 1, 1937. The line was extended past Maegō to Nishitakizawa Station in December of the same year. The JGR became the Japan National Railway (JNR) after World War II. The Yashima Line was privatized on 1 October 1985, becoming the Yuri Kōgen Railway Chōkai Sanroku Line. A new station building was completed in December 2003.

Surrounding area

See also
List of railway stations in Japan

External links

Railway stations in Japan opened in 1922
Railway stations in Akita Prefecture
Yurihonjō